USI or Usi may stand for:
 Usi (food), a starch dish of the Urhobo people of Nigeria
 Uši, an album by Czech band Uz jsme doma
 Usi County, a county in westernmost Chagang province, North Korea
 USI Tech, a suspected ponzi scheme
 USI Wireless, a Minnesota internet service provider
 User System Interaction, a postgraduate engineering design program in the Netherlands
 Union of Independent Trade Unions (Portugal)
 Union of Students in Ireland, the representative body for students' unions in Ireland
 Unione Sindacale Italiana, an Italian trade union
 Union Solidarity International (USi), an international labour organising support organisation
 Unique Student Identifier, a unique identifier for all students in Australia
 Unique Swap Identifier, see Unique Transaction Identifier, identifier for trades mandated by financial markets regulation
 United States of Indonesia, a state in Southeast Asia from 1949 to 1950
 Universal Stylus Initiative for interoperable active pen styluses for touchscreen devices
 University of Southern Indiana, a University located in Evansville, Indiana, United States
 Università della Svizzera italiana, the University of Italian-speaking Switzerland
 University of Siegen, a University located in Siegen, North Rhine-Westphalia, Germany 
 Unlimited Software Inc., see Distinctive Software